Jesse Franklin (1760–1823) was a U.S. Senator from North Carolina from 1799 to 1805 and from 1807 to 1813. Senator Franklin may also refer to:

Benjamin Cromwell Franklin (1805–1873), Texas State Senate
Benjamin Joseph Franklin (1839–1898), Kansas State Senate
Littleton Purnell Franklin (1831–1888), Maryland State Senate
Meshack Franklin (1772–1839), North Carolina State Senate
Morris Franklin (1801–1885), New York State Senate
Rosa Franklin (born 1927), Washington State Senate